Walter Mafli (10 May 1915 – 11 December 2017) was a Swiss painter.

References

1915 births
2017 deaths
People from the canton of St. Gallen
People from the canton of Vaud
20th-century Swiss painters
21st-century Swiss painters
Swiss centenarians
Men centenarians
20th-century Swiss male artists
21st-century Swiss male artists